Attorney General Graham may refer to:

Doug Graham (born 1942), Attorney-General of New Zealand
Jan Graham (fl. 1970s–2000s), Attorney General of Utah
Malcolm D. Graham (1827–1878), Attorney General of Texas

See also
General Graham (disambiguation)